José Israel Gutiérrez Zermeño (born January 15, 1993) is a Mexican basketball player for Dorados de Chihuahua and the Mexico national team, where he participated at the 2014 FIBA Basketball World Cup.

References

External links
 RealGM profile

1993 births
Living people
2014 FIBA Basketball World Cup players
Aguacateros de Michoacán players
Argentino de Junín basketball players
Astros de Jalisco players
Basketball players at the 2015 Pan American Games
Basketball players at the 2019 Pan American Games
Basketball players from Hidalgo (state)
Caballeros de Culiacán players
Centers (basketball)
Fuerza Regia de Monterrey players
Halcones de Ciudad Obregón players
Halcones Rojos Veracruz players
Mexican expatriate basketball people in Argentina
Mexican men's basketball players
Pan American Games competitors for Mexico
Sportspeople from Pachuca